(Gaius) Vipstanus Messalla Gallus (c. 10 BC – aft. 60) was a Roman senator.

Life
He was consul suffectus in the nundinium of July-December 48 as the colleague of Lucius Vitellius. J. Devrecker has offered the argument that the elements in his name ought to be set out as Gaius Messalla Vipstanus Gallus. 

Gallus has been identified as the proconsul of Asia for the term 59/60.

Based on the elements of his cognomen Messalla, Ronald Syme suggested that Vipstanus Messalla Gallus was the son of Lucius Vipstanus Gallus and a postulated Valeria Messallia, paternal granddaughter of Marcus Valerius Messalla Corvinus. He succeeded as consul suffectus Lucius Vipstanus Poplicola Messalla, who completed his consulate in July 48, and who has been suggested to have been his brother, also based on the elements of his cognomeni Poplicola Messalla.

It is also surmised that Gallus is the father of the orator Lucius Vipstanus Messalla. She has not yet been identified.

References

Suffect consuls of Imperial Rome
Roman governors of Asia
Year of death unknown
Messalla Gallus
Messalla Gallus
10s BC births